Switzerland competed at the 2019 Military World Games held in Wuhan, China from 18 to 27 October 2019. According to the official results athletes representing Switzerland won four gold medals, one silver medal and eight bronze medals; instead, the medal count appears to be 12 rather than 13 (see below). The country finished in 15th place in the medal table.

Medal summary

Medal by sports

Medalists

References 
 2019 Military World Games Results

Nations at the 2019 Military World Games
2019 in Swiss sport